Bundschuh (from  "alliance" (in this context "lace", "thong") plus Schuh "shoe") is a German surname derived from an ensign of uprising peasants in the late 15th and early 16th century in southwestern Germany. Notable people with the name include:
 Eva-Maria Bundschuh (born 1941), German operatic soprano
 Werner Bundschuh (born 1951), Austrian historian, author and teacher
 Waltraud Bundschuh (1928–2014), German politician

See also 
 
 Bundschuh movement

References 

German-language surnames